Fallen from Grace is the fourth album by American hip hop group Insane Poetry.

Track listing

References 

2007 albums
Insane Poetry albums
Self-released albums
Horrorcore albums